Bai Yan (born May 21, 1989 in Nanjing, Jiangsu) is a Chinese male tennis player.

Tennis career

Juniors
As a junior, Bai reach his highest ranking as world No. 10 in the singles world rankings in January 2007.

2010
Yan won back-to-back ITF Men's Circuit titles in September before knocking off World No. 30 Radek Štěpánek at the Shanghai Masters the following month.

2012
After not competing on tour in 2011, Bai opened 2012 by reaching the singles semifinals of China F2 ITF Men's Circuit tournament.

2017
Bai opened the 2017 season by winning the Hong Kong F6 futures.

Yan has reached 24 career singles finals all on the ITF Futures tour, with a record of 19 wins and 5 losses. Additionally, he has reached 20 career doubles finals with a record of 13 wins and 7 losses, which includes a record of 4–0 in ATP Challenger Tour finals.

Yan represents his native country of China competing during the Davis Cup. He holds a singles record of 3–2 and a doubles record of 1–1 for a combined Davis Cup record of 4–3.

ATP Challenger and ITF Futures/World Tennis Tour finals

Singles: 25 (19–6)

Doubles: 20 (13–7)

Notes

References

External links
 
 
 

1989 births
Living people
Chinese male tennis players
Sportspeople from Nanjing
Tennis players at the 2010 Asian Games
Tennis players at the 2014 Asian Games
Tennis players from Jiangsu
Asian Games competitors for China